Ken(ny) or Kenneth Green(e) may refer to:

Sportspeople
Ken Green (basketball, born 1959), American basketball player
Ken Green (footballer, born 1924) (1924–2001), English footballer (Birmingham City)
Ken Green (footballer, born 1929), English footballer (Grimsby Town)
Ken Green (golfer) (born 1958), American golfer
Kenny Green (basketball, born 1964), formerly of Wake Forest University
Kenny Green (basketball, born 1967), formerly of the University of Rhode Island

Others
Kenneth Green (physicist) (1911–1997), American accelerator physicist
Kenny Green (voice actor), American voice actor for FUNimation Entertainment
Kenny Greene (1969–2001), American musician
Kenneth P. Green, American environmental scientist
Ken Greene (born 1956), American football